Meso or mesos may refer to:

 Apache Mesos, a computer clustering management platform
 Meso, in-game currency for the massively multiplayer online role-playing game MapleStory
 Meso compound, a stereochemical classification in chemistry
 Mesolithic, archaeological period between the Upper Paleolithic and the Neolithic
 Mesopotamia, the first major river civilization, known today as Iraq
 Mesoamerica, Americas, or Native Americans
 Mesothelioma, a form of cancer
 Mesoscopic physics,  subdiscipline of condensed matter physics that deals with materials of an intermediate size
 Multiple Equivalent Simultaneous Offers, a strategy used in negotiation